Lee Powell (born 2 June 1973) is a Welsh football forward, who played for Southampton.

Career statistics

References

External links

Profile

1973 births
Living people
Welsh footballers
Association football forwards
Premier League players
Southampton F.C. players
Hamilton Academical F.C. players
Yeovil Town F.C. players
Wales under-21 international footballers
Scottish Football League players